Le Noël de Roch Voisine is a 2004 Christmas album of the Canadian singer Roch Voisine.

The album was released initially as Le Noël de Roch Voisine in November 2004 containing 12 tracks. It was also made available on RV International label on a joint CD and DVD package on 9 November 2004 under the amended title Le Noël de Roch dropping Voisine from the title.

This album should not be confused with his earlier and far more successful 2000 Christmas album L'album de Noël.

Track list
"Joyeux Noël" (3:12)
"Marie-Noël" (3:31)
"L'enfant au tambour" (4:14)
"Au royaume du bonhomme Hiver" (2:26)
"Promenade en traîneau" (2:53)
"Noël blanc" (3:40)
"Petit Papa Noël" (4:15)
"Sainte Nuit" (3:54)
"Mon beau sapin" (3:43)
"Minuit chrétiens" (5:21)
"23 décembre" (4:39)
"Noël du campeur" (4:47)

Charts

2004 Christmas albums
Roch Voisine albums
French-language albums
Christmas albums by Canadian artists
Pop Christmas albums